This Girl's in Love with You is the sixteenth studio album by American singer Aretha Franklin, released on January 15, 1970 by Atlantic Records. It reached Billboards Top 20 and was reissued on compact disc through Rhino Records in 1993. Her version of The Beatles' "Let It Be" was the first recording of the song to be commercially issued (The Beatles did not release "Let It Be" as a single until March 1970). Songwriter Paul McCartney sent Franklin and Atlantic Records a demo of the song as a guide.

Track listing
Information is based on the album's liner notes
"Son of a Preacher Man" (John Hurley, Ronnie Wilkins) – 3:19
"Share Your Love with Me" (Al Braggs, Deadric Malone) – 3:21
"The Dark End of the Street" (Chips Moman, Dan Penn) – 4:42
"Let It Be" (John Lennon, Paul McCartney) – 3:33
"Eleanor Rigby" (John Lennon, Paul McCartney) – 2:38
"This Girl's in Love with You" (Burt Bacharach, Hal David) – 4:00
"It Ain't Fair	" (Ronnie Miller) – 3:22
"The Weight" (Robbie Robertson) – 2:59
"Call Me" (Aretha Franklin) – 3:57
"Sit Down and Cry" (Clyde Otis, Lou Stallman) – 3:52

Personnel
Information is based on the album's liner notes.

 Main Performance
Aretha Franklin – vocals, acoustic piano, additional keyboards
Duane Allman – slide guitar, steel guitar (7-8)
Brenda Bryant – background vocals (9)
Cissy Houston – background vocals (8-10)
King Curtis – tenor saxophone (2, 7-8)
Pat Lewis – background vocals (9)
Sylvia Shemwell – background vocals (8, 10)
The Sweet Inspirations – background vocals (1-3, 5, 7)
Dee Dee Warwick – background vocals (8, 10)
Jerry Weaver – guitar (4, 10)

 Muscle Shoals Rhythm Section
Barry Beckett – electric piano (All tracks), Hammond organ (All tracks)
Roger Hawkins – drums (All tracks)
Eddie Hinton – guitar (1, 3-6, 9)
David Hood – bass guitar (All tracks) Except for (8) "The Weight" which is Jerry Jemmott
Jimmy Johnson – guitar (1-9); Production 
Ron Albert – recording engineer (3, 5-6, 9)
Adrian Barber – recording engineer (4)
Tom Dowd – recording engineer (1-2, 4, 7-8, 10), record producer
Jerome Gasper – recording engineer (1-2, 4, 7-8, 10)
Chuck Kirkpatrick – recording engineer (3, 5-6, 9)
Arif Mardin – record producer, musical arrangement, string arrangement
Jerry Wexler – record producer

Notes

1970 albums
Aretha Franklin albums
Albums produced by Tom Dowd
Albums produced by Jerry Wexler
Albums produced by Arif Mardin
Atlantic Records albums